Marius Amundsen (born 22 September 1992 in Lørenskog) is a Norwegian football defender who plays for Skjetten.

Career
Amundsen started his career with Lillestrøm before joining Strømmen IF in 2012.

In July 2014 he left Strømmen and returned to Lillestrøm. His first team debut came against Aalesund in July 2014, in a match that ended in a 1-1 draw.

In the summer of 2021 he joined fifth-tier Skjetten SK.

Career statistics

Honours
 Lillestrøm
Norwegian Football Cup (1): 2017

References

External links 
 «Marius Amundsen», profil on Lillestrøm SKs web page
 

1992 births
Living people
People from Lørenskog
Norwegian footballers
Eliteserien players
Norwegian First Division players
Association football defenders
Strømmen IF players
Lillestrøm SK players
Skjetten SK players
Sportspeople from Viken (county)